Ferry Street may refer to:

 Ferry Street, Hong Kong
 Ferry Street (Newark)

See also
 Anoka–Champlin Mississippi River Bridge, in Minnesota, also called Ferry Street Bridge
 Ferry Street Bridge (Eugene, Oregon)